Maafushi may refer to the following places in the Republic of Maldives:

 Maafushi (Kaafu Atoll), an inhabited island
 Maafushi (Baa Atoll), an uninhabited island 
 Maafushi (Dhaalu Atoll), an uninhabited island
 Maafushi (Faafu Atoll), an uninhabited island